Pyrausta mitis is a moth in the family Crambidae. It is found in Chile.

References

Moths described in 1883
mitis
Moths of South America
Endemic fauna of Chile